Eric Blandin is a French aerodynamicist who currently works for the Aston Martin Formula 1 team.

Career 
In 1998, after finishing his master's degree in fluid mechanics at Pierre and Marie Curie University, Blandin began his career as an aerodynamicist at Fondmetal Technologies, working in the production of wind tunnels. In 2002, he transferred to the Jaguar Formula 1 team, working in the aerodynamics field. Blandin remained with the Milton Keynes-based team following its transformation to Red Bull Racing, becoming team leader in the aerodynamics field before his departure in late 2009. During this period, he worked alongside Dan Fallows.

As of January 2010, Blandin spent 14 months as Ferrari's head of aerodynamics before joining Mercedes as principal aerodynamics engineer the following year. In 2017 he was promoted to the position of chief aerodynamicist.

On November 24, 2021, it was announced that Blandin would leave Mercedes and join the Aston Martin team in early 2022. The team did not specify what role Blandin will fill. However, it was later disclosed that Blandin will only actually work at Aston Martin in October 2022, after a period of absence from all matters related to Mercedes.

References

Year of birth missing (living people)
Living people
Ferrari people
Formula One engineers
Jaguar in Formula One
Red Bull Racing
Mercedes-Benz in Formula One
Aston Martin in Formula One